Allyce Beasley ( Tannenberg) is an American actress. She is best known for her role as rhyming, love-struck receptionist Agnes DiPesto in the television series Moonlighting. From 2001 to 2007, she was the announcer on Playhouse Disney, a morning lineup of programming for toddlers on Disney Channel. She appeared briefly as a guidance counselor in the comedy film Legally Blonde and played Coach's daughter, Lisa Pantusso, on Cheers. She also announced the safety video during The Simpsons Ride at Universal Studios Hollywood and Florida.

Early life 
Beasley was born in Brooklyn, New York as Allyce Tannenberg, the daughter of Marvin, a magazine cartoonist, and Harriet Tannenberg, who worked as a bookkeeper. Beasley is Jewish. She and her family moved frequently during her childhood, living in Philadelphia, Long Island and New York City, before settling in the latter location.

She studied philosophy at the State University of New York, aspiring to be a poet. However, Beasley developed an interest in acting and soon shifted her focus to theater. She dropped out of college and began acting in local theater productions in New Mexico. Upon returning to New York, Beasley took drama classes under Lee Strasberg during the day while working nights as a waitress to make ends meet. Her professional surname was chosen after football player Beasley Reece. She moved to Los Angeles, California in 1982.

Career

Television and film work 
Early in her career, Beasley appeared as Coach Pantusso's daughter  on Cheers and played the role of Latka Gravas' one night stand on sitcom Taxi. She also made guest appearances on crime drama Remington Steele and sitcom ALF.

In 1985, she landed the role of receptionist Agnes DiPesto on Moonlighting, starring opposite Cybill Shepherd and Bruce Willis. Beasley claims to have auditioned for the role multiple times before getting the part. For her work on Moonlighting, Beasley received two Primetime Emmy Award nominations for Outstanding Supporting Actress in a Drama Series in 1986 and 1987. Beasley continued playing the character until the series ended in 1989.

Following the end of Moonlighting, Beasley was often typecast in roles similar to Agnes, which she found creatively frustrating. She was a friend of Susan Dey's character in television movie Lies and Lullabies and acted in the 1993 miniseries The Tommyknockers, based on the novel by Stephen King. Beasley started appearing in films during the 1990s, having roles in Dream with the Fishes (1997) and Stuart Little (1999).

She guest starred in one episode of Joan of Arcadia as Cat Woman God. On Bored to Death, she played the role of Jonathan Ames (Jason Schwartzman)'s mother Florence and appeared on the YouTube Premium series Champaign ILL.

Voice work 
Beasley has also worked as a voice actress. Her first voice over work was portraying two cats in the Garfield special Garfield on the Town (1983). She is probably best known for her role as Miss Alordayne Grotke in the popular Walt Disney TV series Recess (1997−2001), reprising this role in the feature film Recess: School's Out (2001) and three direct-to-video specials.

She has also voiced herself in an episode of Johnny Bravo, made a guest appearance in the television series The Wild Thornberrys, Extreme Ghostbusters, Pound Puppies, Darkwing Duck, Lloyd in Space and Duckman in addition to voicing several characters in the video game EverQuest II.

Beasley narrated for Playhouse Disney from April 16, 2001, until March 30, 2007. She was also the announcer for the safety video with Itchy and Scratchy that plays during The Simpsons Ride at Universal Studios Hollywood and Florida.

Stage work 
During the summer of 2009, she was seen onstage in The Drowsy Chaperone at Gateway Playhouse on Long Island, playing Mrs. Tottendale.

She replaced Veanne Cox in the role of Mme. Renaud/Mme. Dindon in the Tony Award-winning revival of La Cage aux Folles alongside Kelsey Grammer and Douglas Hodge on September 14, 2010.

In the spring of 2014, she portrayed Doris in the musical Damn Yankees  with Lora Lee Gayer at the Goodspeed Opera House in East Haddam, Connecticut.

Personal life 
Beasley married photographer Christopher Sansocie in 1970. They divorced in 1972. While appearing on Taxi, Beasley met actor Vincent Schiavelli. The two were married from 1985 to 1988, and they had one son, Andrea Schiavelli. In 1999, Beasley married for the third time to her current husband Jim Bosche, a writer.

Beasley was diagnosed with breast cancer in 1998. After undergoing a partial mastectomy and stem cell transplant, she was declared cancer free.

Filmography 
King's Crossing (1982)
Taxi (1982)
Cheers (1982)
Filthy Rich (1982)
Remington Steele (1983)
One Cooks, the Other Doesn't (1983) (TV)
Garfield on the Town (1983) (TV) (voice) as Girl Cat 2 and 3
The Ratings Game (1984) (TV)
Shaping Up (1984)
Moonlighting (1985–1989) as Agnes DiPesto
Late Night with David Letterman (1986)
Dolly (1987)
Pound Puppies (1987) (voice) as Beazer
Silent Night, Deadly Night 4: Initiation (1990) as Janice
What a Dummy (1990)
ALF (1990) (TV) 1 episode
Motorama (1991)
Superboy (1991)
Shades of L.A. (1991)
Darkwing Duck (1991) (voice) as Tia
Wilder Napalm (1993)
The Tommyknockers (1993) (TV)
Lies and Lullabies (1993) (TV)
Loaded Weapon 1 (1993)
All-New Dennis the Menace (1993) (voice)
Heaven Help Us (1994)
Magic Kid II (1994)
Duckman (1994) (voice) – In the episode "It's the Thing of the Principal"
Entertaining Angels: The Dorothy Day Story (1996)
Rumpelstiltskin (1996)
Touched by an Angel (1996)
Recess (1997) (voice) as Mrs. Grotke
Johnny Bravo (1997) (voice) – Herself
Extreme Ghostbusters (1997) (voice)
Dream with the Fishes (1997)
The Wild Thornberrys (1998) – Galapagos Penguin and Ground Finch (Eliza-cology)
The Prince and the Surfer (1999)
Stuart Little (1999)
Diagnosis: Murder (2000)
7th Heaven (2000)
Call Me Claus (2001) (TV)
Recess Christmas: Miracle on Third Street (2001) (TV)
Legally Blonde (2001)
Recess: School's Out (2001) (voice)
I Might Even Love You (2001)
Wishcraft (2002)
Cathedral (2002)
The John Kerwin Show (2002)
Lloyd in Space (2002) as Mrs. McNoggin (voice)
Recess: Taking the Fifth Grade (2003) (voice)
Numbers Farm (voice) Peep (voice)
Recess: All Growed Down (2003) (voice)
A Foreign Affair (released on DVD as Two Brothers and a Bride) (2003)
No Ordinary Hero (2004)
Joan of Arcadia (2004)
EverQuest II (2004) (VG) (voice)
Shattered! (2008)
As the World Turns (2009)
Medium (2009)
Gravity (2010)
Bored To Death (2010)
Gotham (2015) as Nurse Dorothy Duncan in S1.E11 Rogues' Gallery
Law & Order Special Victims Unit (TV series) (2016) as Mrs. Weissman.
Maniac (TV series) (2018) as Subject 11

References

External links 

20th-century American actresses
21st-century American actresses
American film actresses
Actresses from New York City
American musical theatre actresses
American television actresses
American voice actresses
Jewish American actresses
Living people
21st-century American Jews
Year of birth missing (living people)